Prosopocera antennata is a species of beetle in the family Cerambycidae. It was described by Charles Joseph Gahan in 1890. It has a wide distribution throughout Africa.

Subspecies
 Prosopocera antennata antennata Gahan, 1890
 Prosopocera antennata quadripunctata Aurivillius, 1920

References

Prosopocerini
Beetles described in 1890